Cove Neck is a village located within the Town of Oyster Bay in Nassau County, on the North Shore of Long Island, in New York. The population was 286 at the 2010 census.

History
Cove Neck incorporated as a village in 1927.

Cove Neck is the site of the home of President Theodore Roosevelt. His estate, Sagamore Hill, is now a museum operated by the National Park Service. It attracts many visitors annually.

On January 25, 1990, Avianca Flight 52, a Boeing 707, ran out of fuel before crashing into a hillside in Cove Neck. 73 out of the 158 passengers and crew on board died in the accident.

Geography

The village is located on a peninsula projecting into Oyster Bay. It is located directly across from Centre Island.

Demographics

As of the census of 2000, there were 300 people, 110 households, and 83 families in the village. The population density was 233.4 people per square mile (89.8/km). Cove Neck is the least densely populated community in Nassau County. There were 140 housing units at an average density of 108.9 per square mile (41.9/km). es living together, 7.3% had a female householder with no husband present, and 24.5% were non-families. 19.1% of households were one person and 11.8% were one person aged 65 or older. The average household size was 2.73 and the average family size was 3.16.

The age distribution was 26.3% under the age of 18, 4.7% from 18 to 24, 20.3% from 25 to 44, 29.3% from 45 to 64, and 19.3% 65 or older. The median age was 44 years. For every 100 females, there were 96.1 males. For every 100 females age 18 and over, there were 87.3 males.

Government 
As of December 2021, the Mayor of Cove Neck is Thomas R. Zoller, the Deputy Mayor is Lisabeth Harris, and the Village Trustees are Joseph Castellano, Lisabeth Harris, Marjorie Isaksen, and Marta Kelly.

Politics 
In the 2016 U.S. presidential election, the majority of Cove Neck voters voted for Hillary Clinton (D).

Education
The entirety of Cove Neck is located within the boundaries of (and is thus served by) the Oyster Bay-East Norwich Central School District. As such, all children who reside within the village and attend public schools go to Oyster Bay–East Norwich's schools.

Notable people 

 John McEnroe – Tennis player.
 Theodore Roosevelt – 26th President of the United States.
 Charles Wang – Businessman and former owner of the New York Islanders.

References

External links
 Village of Cove Neck official website

Oyster Bay (town), New York
Villages in New York (state)
Long Island Sound
Villages in Nassau County, New York
Populated coastal places in New York (state)
Sundown towns in New York (state)